A plotter is a computer printer for printing vector graphics.

Plotter may also refer to:
Plotter (instrument), an instrument that marks positions on a map or chart
Plotter (RAF), a person who records the movement of military aircraft in an Operations Room
Navigator, a person who marks positions on a map or chart

See also
Plot (disambiguation)
Conspiracy (disambiguation)